The Thompson Okanagan Junior Lacrosse League (TOJLL) is one of two Junior B Tier 1  box lacrosse leagues sanctioned by the British Columbia Lacrosse Association in British Columbia, Canada. The league champion competes for the British Columbia Junior B Tier 1 Provincial Championship. Teams have competed for the Founders Cup, a national tournament which determines the Canadian Junior B lacrosse champion.

History
1999: Thompson-Okanagan Junior Lacrosse League founded by Dan Wray to provide a quality lacrosse environment for players aged 16 to 20. Wray first launched the concept of organized lacrosse for players in Grades 11 and 12 with an intermediate league in the Interior for three years in the late 1990s. With a large and talented crop of 1983-born talent coming out of the midget ranks, Wray felt the time was right to launch a junior B circuit for players in the valley. The new league would begin regular season play in 2000.

2000: The league appointed Phil Reunoff as its first Commissioner. The Rutland Raiders defeated the North Okanagan Tigers in the final series to claim the inaugural TOJLL Championship.

2001: The TOJLL season was a fifteen-game regular season. The South Okanagan Flames were forced to forfeit three games due to ineligible player rules. The playoffs were a best-of-three semifinals and a best-of-five finals. The league had six teams: Kamloops Rattlers, Kelowna Braves, Kelowna Dragons, North Okanagan Tigers, Rutland Raiders and South Okanagan Flames.

2002: Cam Morrison became the league's second commissioner. The TOJLL allowed the Prince George Posse into the league, as an exhibition team, for the eighteen-game regular season. Note: The Posse went on to a perfect (18–0–0) season.

2003: The TOJLL expanded with the inclusion of the Armstrong Shamrocks. The North Okanagan Tigers are renamed the Vernon Tigers. The Kelowna Braves had to forfeit seven games due to ineligible player rules, as a result the Vernon Tigers gain two wins for a perfect season (18-0-0).(See: July 5, 2003)  The Vernon Tigers, represented the TOJLL in the Provincials, losing to the Prince George Posse, 9–7, in the gold medal game.

2004: The TOJLL hosted the Provincials which meant that two teams from the TOJLL would play in the tournament. Those teams were the Vernon Tigers (0–4 in the Provincial round robin), as host, and the Kamloops Rattlers (1–3 in the Provincial round robin) as 2004 TOJLL Champions. The Rattlers went on to play the Peninsula Falcons (2–1–1) for the Bronze Medal, winning 6–5.

2005: The TOJLL was represented by the league champions, Kamloops Rattlers, at the Provincials. They Rattlers came away with a silver medal, losing the final, 16–15, to the Westshore Bears.

2006: Prior to the start of the TOJLL season the Kelowna Braves and Kelowna Dragons amalgamated to form the Kelowna Warriors. The league initiated a pre-season schedule by including the Annual Archie Jack Memorial Ice Breaker Tournament, which is played in Armstrong, British Columbia. With the loss of one team, the league reverted to a fifteen-game regular season. The playoff format was changed to that of a (best-of-three) quarterfinals, semifinals and a (best-of-five) finals, the top two teams, of the regular season, got a first round playoff  bye.

2007: Ed Kwasniewski became the league's third commissioner. The TOJLL saw no major changes, maintaining the same regular season and playoff formats as in 2006. The league did however create its first online presence with a website through Teamopolis Inc.

2008: The Kamloops Venom became a member of the TOJLL. The TOJLL also welcomed the newly formed West Kootenay Wolf Pack to the league, as an exhibition team, for the now fourteen game regular season.

2009: The Vernon Tigers won the league championship and won a Silver Medal at the Provincials.

2010: The Kamloops Venom won the TOJLL Championship, a Provincial Gold Medal (a first for the league) and a Bronze Medal at the Founders Cup. The South Okanagan Flames have the dubious honor of being the first team to go winless in a season.

2011: Prior to the start of the TOJLL season, the Kelowna Warriors and Rutland Raiders merged to become the Kelowna Raiders. The league also decided to have a fifteen game regular season.

2012: Dan Wray became the league's fourth commissioner. The Kamloops Rattlers ceased operations prior to the start of the season. The remaining teams played an abbreviated schedule due to a league controversy concerning the players of the Rattlers. That issue was resolved by the BCLA... "I am writing to inform you that at an emergency meeting of the Senior Directorate, the 11-member panel voted to uphold point 5.06 in the BCLA Senior Operating Policy," wrote Christine Pollock, BCLA's senior directorate chair, in a ruling. "This allows for any junior age player residing in Kamloops to play for the Kamloops Venom, currently the only junior B team in Kamloops registered with the BCLA."  The league changed the playoff format to that of semifinals and finals, both a best-of-five series.

2013: The TOJLL was represented by, league champions, the Vernon Tigers in the Provincial Tournament. The Tigers went 0–3 in round-robin play, then lost the Bronze Medal Game, 13–9, to the Delta Islanders. The TOJLL regular season was increased to sixteen games.

2014: The Provincial championships was hosted by the Vernon Tigers. The Delta Islanders won the final defeating Vernon, 14–7.

2015: For the second time in the TOJLL, the Vernon Tigers, had a perfect regular season (16–0–0).

2016: The league switched website providers, from Teamopolis to TeamPages, this resulted in the loss of all statistics for years 2007 to 2015.

2017: The TOJLL and Vernon Tigers hosted the Junior B Lacrosse Provincials. The Kelowna Raiders became the first team in league history to go pointless for the regular season. They finished the season with a record of 0–16, which includes 3 defaulted games, noted as a, 1–0 loss.

2018: Guy Charron became the league's fifth commissioner, league declares themselves "tier 1" and the Kelowna Raiders folded. The league once again switched website providers from TeamPages to LacrosseShift (http://tojll.lacrosseshift.com/home), along with the league statistics from 2016 and 2017. For the first time in league history there will be non-sudden death, ten minute, overtime games.

2019: The Commissioner steps down after just one year and Jeff Hanley becomes the league's (sixth) commissioner. The Armstrong Shamrocks take a leave-of-absence for the season. The playoffs will consist of a best-of-three semifinal between second & third place, the first place team receives a bye to the best-of-five finals.

2020: The league expands to five teams with the re-entry of the Armstrong Shamrocks, mainly with players and coach from Salmon Arm. Another new team ,from Kelowna, called the Kelowna Kodiaks, is operated by the  Kelowna Minor Lacrosse Association. League cancels season due to the covid-19 pandemic.

2021: Due to the ongoing Covid-19 pandemic there was no regular season play. With an ease of covid-19 restrictions though, the league held a two week-end tournament-style playoffs on July 10 and July 24. Heather Davis becomes the leagues (seventh) Commissioner after Jeff Hanley vacated the office mid-term.

2022: Teams play a 16 game regular season, playing the other teams 4 times, 2 home and 2 away. The pre-season 17th Annual Archie Jack Memorial Icebreaker Tournament was held on April 23. The season saw numerous games rescheduled, forfeited, and cancelled out right. The most controversial of these games was the forfeiting of the Vernon Tigers home opener. Citing lack of healthy players the South Okanagan Flames could not make the game to play Vernon. A game between the South Okanagan Flames and Kamloops Venom required the attention of the British Columbia Lacrosse Association. Kamloops originally won the game 12-4 but, the Flames protested citing an ineligible player. The game was eventually awarded to the South Okanagan Flames as a 1-0 win. The playoffs overall were very straight forward. However the Kelowna Kodiaks had to forfeit game 3 of their best-of-three series due to the arena not having enough staff to operate.

Current teams

Records by season

Note: * lost points due to ineligible player

Note: * – forfeited 3 games

Note: ^ – Point for the forfeit due to ineligible playerv(Raiders)
/  ** – Points for 7 wins forfeit (and redistributed) due to ineligible player
/  * – Points added from forfeited games

Note: * – includes default wins & losses

Note: Tie-breaker was determined by (Head to Head)

Note: * = includes, Default wins and losses

NOTE The 2020 season was cancelled due to the Covid-19 pandemic

Playoff recaps
2000: Rutland Raiders become the leagues inaugural champions, defeating the North Okanagan Tigers. The two Kelowna teams the Braves and Dragons were semi finalists. The Kamloops Rattlers along with the South Okanagan Flames failed to qualify.

2001: Rutland Raiders defeated the Kelowna Braves in the semi-finals, two games to zero. The Raiders met the North Okanagan Tigers in the final and defeated them three games to two. The Tigers beat the Kamloops Rattlers two games to zero in the other semi-final.

2002: North Okanagan Tigers defeated the Kamloops Rattlers in the semi-finals, in two games. The Tigers then met up with the Kelowna Dragons in the final. The Dragons defeated the Rutland Raiders in a very close two game sweep, in the semi-final. The North Okanagan Tigers defeated the Kelowna Dragons in three games to claim the League Championship.

2003: Vernon Tigers became champions for the second time by defeating the Kelowna Dragons in the championship final by a three-game sweep. The Tigers defeated the Kamloops Rattlers 2–0 in the semi-final. In the other semi-final, the Kelowna Dragons defeated the Rutland Raiders 2–1, in a best-of-three.

2004: Kamloops Rattlers defeated the Rutland Raiders three games to two, to claim the championship. They eliminated the Vernon Tigers in a semi-final match-up, two games to one. To get to the final, the Rutland Raiders defeated the Kelowna Dragons in a two-game sweep.

2005: Kamloops Rattlers would become the second team to win back-to-back championships. The Rattlers earned a championship final playoff berth by defeating the South Okanagan Flames in a two-game sweep. The other finals berth was earned by the Rutland Raiders, who defeated the Vernon Tigers in their semifinals series, 2–0. The Rattlers completely demolished the Raiders in that final series, winning in a three-game sweep, with a combined score of 47–18.

2006: The 2006 season playoffs would prove to be unique for the league as the Kamloops Rattlers would win a third consecutive League Championship. In the playoff quarter-finals best-of-three, the Vernon Tigers defeated the Armstrong Shamrocks and the Kelowna Warriors defeated the South Okanagan Flames in two-game sweeps. For the semi-finals, the Kamloops Rattlers defeated the Kelowna Warriors in two games. In the other semi-final, the Rutland Raiders won the first game against the Vernon Tigers 11–6. The Tigers would win the second game, 11–8, but had to forfeit due to an ineligible player ruling. The 2006 TOJLL Championship final series between the Kamloops Rattlers and Rutland Raiders would go the distance, best-of-five, and the Rattlers prevailed. In the Provincials, the Kamloops Rattlers garnered a Bronze Medal for the TOJLL, with a 10–8 win over the Westshore Bears.
  
2007: The format was the same as the previous season, as was the result on the floor. For an unprecedented fourth time, the Kamloops Rattlers emerged as league champions. The Rattlers defeated the Kelowna Warriors in semi-final action, 2–0 and the Rutland Raiders in the finals, 3–0. In the other playoff series, the Vernon Tigers defeated the South Okanagan Flames, 2–0 and then lost to the Raiders, 0–2. The Armstrong Shamrocks lost to the Kelowna Warriors, 2–1. The Shamrocks and Warriors only played fourteen regular season games, as a game that had to be cancelled earlier in the season was never played. The Kamloops Rattlers hosted the Founders Cup, going 3–1 in pool A. For the playdowns the Rattlers lost to Calgary Mountaineers, won against the Sherwood Park Titans but, still failed to make the medal round.

2008: The 2008 league champions, the Kamloops Rattlers, earned a Silver Medal at the Provincials. In round robin play the Venom went 3–1, which secured second place. In the Provincial Gold medal game against the Coquitlam Adanacs, the score was 8–4. The Rattlers finished first overall, in league play, and along with the Rutland Raiders received a first-round playoff bye. In the second round, the Rattlers met up with the Vernon Tigers, and defeated them two games to one. Previously the Tigers defeated the Kamloops Venom two games to one in a quarterfinal match-up. The Raiders, meanwhile, faced the Kelowna Warriors with the Warriors pulling off an upset come-from-behind series win, two games to one. The Warriors advanced from the first round and defeated the South Okanagan Flames in two games. For their fifth consecutive TOJLL Championship, the Kamloops Rattlers defeated the Kelowna Warriors in a three-game sweep.

2009: Vernon Tigers, garnered a Silver Medal at the Provincials. In round robin play, their record was three wins with one loss, which secured second place. In the gold medal game against the Port Moody Thunder the score ended up nine to five. The Tigers placed third in league play and in the league final, against the Kamloops Venom, and won three games to two. The Tigers were down in the series two games to none. Vernon reached the final by having previously defeated the Rutland Raiders in the Quarter Finals and the South Okanagan Flames in the Semi Finals both in two game sweeps. Kamloops earned their trip to the league final by sweeping their crosstown rival Kamloops Ratters in quarter final action,2–0 and the Kelowna Warriors in the semi finals, 2–1. The Kelowna Warriors and the South Okanagan Flames received a first-round playoff bye for being ranked first and second, respectively, in regular season play.

2010: Kamloops Venom won the league's first Provincial Championship with a 6–4 win over the Westshore Bears (PNWJLL). During the provincial round-robin, the Venom went two wins with one loss, good for first place, to earn entry into the gold medal game. The Venom entered the Provincials by defeating the first place Vernon Tigers three games to one,  for the TOJLL Championship. The Venom had previously defeated the Kelowna Warriors in a semi final series, two game to zero. In the other semi final it was the Tigers over the Kamloops Ratters, two games to none. The Warriors defeat the Rutland Raiders in two games in the quarter finals, and the Rattlers beat the Armstrong Shamrocks in two games. After game four, which the Venom won 5–4 in overtime, the Vernon Tigers submitted a formal protest to the BCLA, citing an ineligible player on the Venoms roster. The BCLA ruled in favor of the Tigers, giving them the win for game four and scheduling a game five. The TOJLL Commissioner then protested the BCLAs ruling, stating that he gave the Venom permission to use this player (the Rattlers' starting goalie) only in an emergency situation. His protest was denied. The Venom submitted an official protest on the BCLA ruling, and a decision was handed down just hours prior to the start of game five, in favor of the Kamloops Venom. The Venom went on to the Founders Cup earning a Bronze Medal.

2011: Kelowna Raiders garnered a silver medal at the Provincials. The Raiders record in the round-robin was 2–1, losing only to the Port Moody Thunder, but earning a spot in the Finals. The Raiders would once again meet Port Moody in the final, losing by a score of 15–8. In the TOJLL playoffs the Kamloops Venom and the Kamloops Rattlers squared off in a quarter final best-of-three match, with the Venom defeating the Rattlers 2–0. In the other quarter final it was the Vernon Tigers squeaking by the South Okanagan Flames 2–0. Semi Final action saw the Tigers take on the Raiders losing the best-of-five, 3–0 and the Venom defeat the Armstrong Shamrocks by the same 3–0. The Finals went the distance as the Raiders got past the Venom 3–2.

2012: The TOJLL playoffs were capped with a provincial championship as the Kamloops Venom garnered the league's second title. The Venom went 3–0 in the preliminary rounds, thus earning a bye to the final, defeated the Delta Islanders 6–3 in the Gold Medal Game. The Kamloops Venom soundly defeated the South Okanagan Flames in the first two games of the best-of-five TOJLL semi-finals by scores of 14–7 and 16–5. South Ok. being short players during the playoffs forfeited game three, giving the Venom the series. In the other series it was the Vernon Tigers defeating the Armstrong Shamrocks in four games. The TOJLL final would also only go to four games as the Kamloops Venom defeated the Vernon Tigers. The Kamloops Venom went winless at the Founders Cup ending with a record of 0–4.

2013: The Vernon Tigers defeated the Armstrong Shamrocks in the best-of-five semi-finals, 3–0. In the other series, it was the Kamloops Venom upsetting the Kelowna Raiders in four games. The TOJLL final would also go to four games as the Vernon Tigers defeated the Kamloops Venom. In the BC Junior B Provincials the Vernon Tigers failed to win a single game. The Tigers lost to the Saanich Tigers (PNWJLL) 21–15, Delta Islanders (WCJLL) 13–2 and the WCJLL hosts, Burnaby Lakers, 11–9, during round-robin play. The Bronze Medal Game featured the third place Delta Islanders versus the fourth place Vernon Tigers, which the Islanders won 13–9.

2014: The first place Kamloops Venom defeated the South Okanagan Flames, three games to zero. The third game was not played as South Ok defaulted. In the other semi-final it was second place Vernon Tigers over powering the Amrstrong Shamrocks in three straight. The Tigers would defeat the Venom, four games to one, in the league final. The Tigers hosting the Provincials meet the Delta Islanders (WCJLL) in the final for the Gold Medal, losing 14–7. The Bronze Medal was won by the Kamloops Venom who defeated the Saanich Tigers (PNWJLL), 15–14.

2015: In the semifinals the first place Vernon Tigers swept fourth place Armstrong Shamrocks in a best-of-five series. South Okanagan Flames were defeated in five games to third-place finisher Kamloops Venom. The TOJLL championship final series (best-of-five), between the Tigers and Venom, was won by Kamloops (3–2).
The Venom went 1–2, in the round-robin portion of the Junior B Provincials tournament. In the bronze medal game, hosts, the Westshore Bears defeated the Venom, 25–13.

2016: For the third year in-a-row the Kelowna Raiders failed to make the playoff rounds. The semifinals featured the Vernon Tigers versus Armstrong Shamrocks and the Kamloops Venom playing the South Okanagan Flames. The Tigers and Venom each swept their best-of-five series, 3–0. The Venom went on to swept the Tigers, 3–0, to claim the TOJLL Championship. At the Provincials, held by the WCJLLs Coquitlam Adanacs, the Venom lost to the host, 18–4, in their first game. In the Venoms second game, they lost to the WCJLLs New Westminster Salmonbellies, 10–7. The Venoms' third game was a win, 13–12, over the PNWJLLs Saanich Tigers. The Venom failed to garner a Bronze Medal as they lost to the Tigers, 13–11.

2017: Semifinal (A), Kamloops Venom versus South Okanagan Flames was won by the Venom, 3–0. Semifinal (B), Vernon Tigers versus Armstrong Shamrocks was won by the Tigers, 3–1. The Kamloops Venom secured their 3rd consecutive league championship downing the Tigers, 3–2. In the Provincials the, Vernon Tigers went 1–2 in round-robin, then lost the Bronze Medal Game 12–11 to the Westshore Bears of the PNWJLL. The Kamloops Venom were 2–1 in the round-robin and lost the Gold Medal Game 9–4 to the WCJLLs Coquitlam Adanacs.

2018: All teams made the playoffs, round one had the Vernon Tigers (1st) playing the South Okanagan Flames (4th) and the Kamloops Venom (2nd) took on the Armstrong Shamrocks (3rd). Both the Tigers (12–6, 14–7, 12–4) and Venom (22–8, 9–5, 17–4) swept their respective, best-of-five, series. Vernon went on to sweep the Venom (13–12, 20–7, 12–9) for the best-of-five league championship. Citing various reasons the Tigers opted out of the Provincials versus the champions of the B.C. Jr. B Tier 1 Lacrosse League.

2019: Kamloops Venom (1st) received a bye to the finals. South Okanagan Flames (2nd) defeated Vernon Tigers (3rd), 2-1 in the best-of-three, semifinals (6-10, 16-4, 10-8)
The Flames went on to win their first TOJLL Championship, defeating the Venom, 3-1(16-15 2OT, 12-9, 7-9, 5-4)). In the Provincials the Flames were defeated by the Victoria Shamrocks of the BCJBT1LL by a two game total-goal series, 27-10(11-6, 16-4)

2020: The regular season, playoffs and Provincials were not played due to the Covid-19 Pandemic

2021: The TOJLL held a two week-end tournament-style playoffs on July 10 and July 24.The Kelowna Kodiaks go undefeated in the tournament to claim the Covid Cup championship. The Kodiaks defeated the Kamloops Venom , 7-5 and Armstrong Shamrocks, 9-8 on July 10. They defeated the South Okanagan Flames, 11-9 and the Vernon Tigers, 9-5 on July 24.

2022: The playoffs consisted of two semifinal series, best-of-three, and a final, best-of-five. In Semifinal A the Kamloops Venom defeated the Vernon Tigers, 2-0. In Semifinal B the South Okanagan Flames upset the Kelowna Kodiaks, 2-1. The series between the Flames and Kodiaks ended in controversy as the Kodiaks had to default due "to circumstances out of their control", which was their home arena was not available. The Championship Finals saw the Kamloops Venom defeat the South Okanagan Flames, 3-0. The Kamloops Venom hosted the Provincials versus Coquitlam Adanacs in a two game total aggregate series. The Venom were defeated, 11-5 and 17-6, by the Adanacs.

Champions
{| class="wikitable"
!Season
!Champion
!Runner-up
!Series
!BC Provincials Result
|-
|2000
|Rutland Raiders
|North Okanagan Tigers
|
|
|-
|2001
|Rutland Raiders
|North Okanagan Tigers
|3–2
|
|-
|2002
|North Okanagan Tigers
|Kelowna Dragons
|3–0
|
|-
|2003
|Vernon Tigers
|Kelowna Dragons
|3–0 
|Vernon Tigers (Silver)
|-
|2004
|Kamloops Rattlers
|Rutland Raiders
|3–2
|Vernon Tigers (Hosts-5th), Kamloops Rattlers (Bronze)
|-
|2005
|Kamloops Rattlers
|Rutland Raiders
|3–0 
|Kamloops Rattlers (Silver)
|-
|2006
|Kamloops Rattlers
|Rutland Raiders
|3–2 
|Kamloops Rattlers (Bronze)
|-
|2007
|Kamloops Rattlers
|Rutland Raiders
|3–0 
|Kamloops Rattlers (Bronze), Rutland Raiders (Hosts-Silver)
|-
|2008
|Kamloops Rattlers
|Kelowna Warriors
|3–0
|Kamloops Rattlers (Silver)
|-
|2009
|Vernon Tigers
|Kamloops Venom
|3–2 
|Vernon Tigers (Silver)
|-
|2010
|Kamloops Venom
|Vernon Tigers
|3–1 
|Kamloops Venom (Gold)
|-
|2011
|Kelowna Raiders
|Kamloops Venom
|3–2 
|Kamloops Venom (Hosts-Bronze), Kelowna Raiders (Silver)
|-
|2012
|Kamloops Venom
|Vernon Tigers
|3–1 
|Kamloops Venom (Gold)
|-
|2013
|Vernon Tigers
|Kamloops Venom
|3–1 
|Vernon Tigers (4th)
|-
|2014
|Vernon Tigers
|Kamloops Venom
|3–1 
|Vernon Tigers (Hosts-Silver), Kamloops Venom (Bronze)
|-
|2015
|Kamloops Venom
|Vernon Tigers
|3–2
|Kamloops Venom (4th)
|-
|2016
|Kamloops Venom
|Vernon Tigers
|3–0 
|Kamloops Venom (4th)
|-
|2017
|Kamloops Venom
|Vernon Tigers
|3–2 
|Vernon Tigers (Hosts-4th), Kamloops Venom (Silver)
|-
|2018
|Vernon Tigers
|Kamloops Venom
|3–0 
|No Provincials
|-
|2019
|South Okanagan Flames
|Kamloops Venom
|3–1 
|Lost, 2 game aggregate, 27-10, to Victoria Shamrocks
|-
|2020
|Did Not Play
|Due to Covid Pandemic
|N/A 
|No Provincials
|-
|2021
|Kelowna Kodiaks
|Round Robin
|4-0
|Covid Cup Championship (Not  Official), No Provincials
|-
|2022
|Kamloops Venom
|South Okanagan Flames
|3-0
|Lost, 2 game aggregate, 28-11, to Coquitlam Adanacs
|}

Wins by club

 - Covid Cup Championship (Not Official)

Former member teams 
Kelowna Braves: (2000–2005) – merged with Kelowna Dragons; formed the Kelowna Warriors
Kelowna Dragons (2000–2005) – merged with Kelowna Braves; formed the Kelowna Warriors
Kelowna Warriors (2006–2010) – merged with Rutland Raiders, formed the Kelowna Raiders
Rutland Raiders (2000–2010) – merged with Kelowna Warriors, formed the Kelowna Raiders
Kamloops Rattlers (2000–2011) – folded
Kelowna Raiders (2011–2017) – folded

References

External links
TOJLL website
Kamloops Venom
Vernon Tigers

Lacrosse leagues in British Columbia
Sports leagues established in 2000
2000 establishments in British Columbia